Mike Haridopolos (born March 15, 1970) served in the Florida Senate (2003–2012) and was elected President of the Florida Senate from 2010 to 2012.  He presided over the largest Republican  Senate majority (28-12) since Reconstruction. He also served in the Florida House of Representatives from 2000 to 2003. He now operates MJH Consulting, a leading business and political consulting firm in Florida.  He is also a regular news contributor for Fox 35 Orlando on political for both national and state political matters.

Education 
Haridopolos received his Bachelor of Arts degree from Stetson University in History and his Master of Arts degree in History from the University of Arkansas.

Teaching career 
Haridopolos taught United States History and Political Science at Brevard Community College—now Eastern Florida State College—starting in 1993. In 1998, he co-authored the book 10 Big Issues Facing Our Generation with fellow instructor Dr. Amy Hendricks. The book includes liberal and conservative viewpoints, and discusses issues such as Medicare, Medicaid, education, taxes, national defense and Social Security.

Beginning in 2007, Haridopolos taught classes as an instructor at the Bob Graham Center at the University of Florida. He created an internship program for university students to work in the legislative process at the Florida State Capitol in Tallahassee. Students took classes early in the morning then worked in the Governor's office, legislative offices and in different agencies or consulting firms. Students who participated in the program now work in the legislative process in Florida and around the nation.

Political career 
In 2000, Haridopolos won an open seat in the Florida House, after winning a six-way Republican primary by over 30 percentage points and later won the November general election 65-35%. As a House freshman, he was recognized as an early leader.  He won the 2002 Republican primary following re-apportionment with over 82% of the vote and was re-elected to the Florida House with 79% of the vote in the general election.

In January 2003, State Senator Howard Futch passed away and special election was called in order to elect a new senator.  Haridopolos won the Republican Party primary with 84% of the vote and won 63% of the vote in the general election to win the remainder of the four-year senate term.  By 2006 many predicted he would be the Lieutenant Governor of Florida as the running mate of Republican nominee Charlie Crist.

In 2008 Haridopolos turned down higher office when he passed on an open Congressional race with the retirement of Congressman Dave Weldon.  Weldon and others asked Haridopolos to run, including the eventual nominee and now Congressman Bill Posey.  Posey stated he would have endorsed Haridopolos if he had sought the seat. Haridopolos endorsed Posey, and Posey went on to easily win both the Republican primary and General Election in 2008. Haridopolos said he wanted to focus on his likely role as Senate President and continue his push to make the Florida Senate more conservative.

In both 2006 and 2010 Haridopolos was re-elected without opposition to the Florida Senate. Haridopolos actively supported conservative candidates throughout the state in the 2006, 2008, and 2010 election cycles. In the Florida Senate Haridopolos served as Majority Whip from 2006–2008 and by 2009 was elected to be President of the Senate by his senate colleagues.  Haridopolos was sworn in as Senate President on November 16, 2010, for a two-year term. He presided over the largest Republican majority (28-12) since Reconstruction. Before being sworn in, Haridopolos made headlines when he removed the doors from his Senate office, making a pledge to be transparent and accessible during his term as President.

Haridopolos is a co-founder of the Freedom Caucus that signs Americans for Tax Reform's Taxpayer Protection Pledge to "oppose and vote against any and all efforts to increase taxes" every year before the Legislature goes into session.

Haridopolos has appeared on Fox News' Huckabee to discuss Transparency Florida, an initiative he led to put the state budget online. He has also appeared on CNN as a guest of Lou Dobbs and has been featured in Florida Trend magazine as a legislator "...who could shape Florida politics". He was also recently named by the Hotline as one of six "rising stars" among Republican state legislators.

Haridopolos sought the Republican nomination to challenge incumbent U.S. Senator Bill Nelson in 2012. The Washington Post has identified Haridopolos as "one of the state Republican Party's rising stars." The Sunshine State News called him "Telegenic and energetic,…a rising star in the party, a relentless campaigner and a bona fide conservative who would draw a sharp philosophical contrast to Nelson." On July 18, 2011, Haridopolos released a campaign video stating that he would no longer seek the nomination for the 2012 U.S. Senate seat, effectively ending his campaign.

During his six month campaign for U.S. Senate, Haridopolos out-fundraised his Republican opponents, raising a total of $3.6 million. His candidacy received a number of endorsements, including former Arkansas Governor Mike Huckabee, US Congressman Connie Mack, CFO Jeff Atwater, and Agriculture Commissioner Adam Putnam. He dropped out of the campaign in July 2011 in order to focus on his position as President of the Florida Senate. He continued to teach at the University of Florida after he left the Florida Senate.

Conservative agenda
Haridopolos became Senate President with the largest Republican majority since reconstruction.

During his first term as Senate President, he oversaw the balancing of the state's budget which suffered a $4 billion shortfall, without raising taxes or fees. Beyond that the Senate also authorized SmartCap, a constitutional amendment that, if adopted, will place strict caps on government spending, as well as the Health Care Freedom Amendment which fights back against the government takeover of health care.

That same year, the Senate also passed more than $300 million in tax relief, including a measure that effectively eliminates the corporate income tax burden for nearly half the roughly 30,000 Florida businesses that currently pay the tax; reformed Florida's entitlement programs, including the state's pension, welfare and Medicaid systems; reformed the state's education system; tightened regulations on unauthorized sales of habit-forming drugs; and reformed the state's growth management laws.

The Orlando Sentinel called the passage of these various measures "…some of the most conservative legislation ever passed out of the state Senate..."

During the 2012 Legislative Session, Haridopolos enumerated his goals. The News Service of Florida reported that "…he [Haridopolos] said the three things he wanted to pass, aside from the two claims bills, were the governor's three big priorities: the increased K-12 education spending, the PIP auto insurance reform, and the tax cut and economic development package. Adding those three to the claims bills, he was five-for-five.

Defending the innocent
In 2010, Haridopolos began to pursue the creation of an innocence commission. The Orlando Sentinel reported that the commission "would study Florida's disturbing practice of imprisoning innocent people."

The same article noted that "…few [lawmakers], however, make lasting impacts — and life-changing differences. Right now, State Sen. Mike Haridopolos is leading a charge to make such a difference." Haridopolos did ultimately secure funding for the creation of the Innocence Commission.

In 2005, Haridopolos supported a claim from Wilton Dedge that he had been convicted and wrongfully imprisoned for 22 years. He was exonerated by DNA testing in August 2004. The claim bill, which awarded Dedge $2 million in compensation, passed in the Florida Legislature during a special session in 2005.

In 2012, Haridopolos helped pass two claims bills to compensate victims of government negligence.

One was a claim for William Dillon, who had been wrongfully incarcerated for 27 years. He was exonerated after DNA testing. He was compensated $1.35 million by the Florida Legislature.

The other was for Eric Brody, who suffered catastrophic injuries after being struck by a police cruiser in 1999.  He was compensated $10.75 million for ongoing medical care.

At the close of the 2012 Legislative Session, a News Service of Florida story noted that "Two lives may be changed for the better by the cash, a long-lasting effect of Haridopolos' persistence."

Jim Greer controversy 
In 2010, Haridopolos received criticism for the sudden resignation of then Republican Party of Florida Chairman Jim Greer. Haridopolos was later validated when Greer was found guilty and sentenced to eighteen months in prison for theft and money-laundering charges.

Subsequent career 
In 2019 Haridopolos co-authored the book The Modern Republican Party in Florida with Peter Dunbar.  The book chronicles the rise of the Republican Party in Florida from the 1950s through the 2018 elections.  The academic book published by the University of Florida Press.

He owns and operates MJH Consulting. He has been recognized as a leading lobbyist in Florida. He is also active in both the National Republican Senatorial Committee and the Republican Governors Association.

Family
Haridopolos is married to Dr. Stephanie Haridopolos; they have three children, Alexis, Hayden and Reagan Brooke.

References

External links
 U.S. Senate Campaign Website
 State Senate Website
 Project Vote Smart - Senator Mike Haridopolos (FL) Profile
 Follow the Money - Mike Haridopolos
 2006 2002 2000 Campaign Contributions

|-

|-

1970 births
American people of Greek descent
Republican Party Florida state senators
Living people
Republican Party members of the Florida House of Representatives
People from Huntington, New York
Presidents of the Florida Senate
Stetson University alumni
University of Arkansas alumni
University of Florida faculty